The Story of Shirley Yorke is a 1948 British drama film directed by Maclean Rogers and starring Derek Farr, Dinah Sheridan and Margaretta Scott. The film was based on the play The Case of Lady Camber by Horace Annesley Vachell. It was made at the Nettlefold Studios in Walton-on-Thames. Art direction was by Charles Gilbert.

Plot
When a nobleman's wife dies during an operation, nurse Shirley Yorke finds herself accused of poisoning, when it is found that she and the peer were formerly lovers.

Cast

References

Bibliography
 Chibnall, Steve & McFarlane, Brian. The British 'B' Film. Palgrave MacMillan, 2009.
 Goble, Alan. The Complete Index to Literary Sources in Film. Walter de Gruyter, 1999.

External links

1948 films
British drama films
British black-and-white films
1948 drama films
Films directed by Maclean Rogers
Films shot at Nettlefold Studios
Films set in England
Films set in London
British films based on plays
Butcher's Film Service films
Films produced by Ernest G. Roy
1949 drama films
1949 films
1940s English-language films
1940s British films